Half Machine Lip Moves is the third studio album by American rock band Chrome. It was released on March 15, 1979 by Siren Records.

The album has been reissued several times on different labels: by Beggars Banquet Records in the United Kingdom in 1980, by Expanded Music in Italy in 1981, by Dossier Records in Germany in 1988, by Touch and Go Records in the United States in 1990, and by Cleopatra Records in the US in 2007 and 2012.

Music 
The creation of Half Machine Lip Moves was helmed by Chrome members Damon Edge and Helios Creed. AllMusic describes the album's basic elements as "aggressive but cryptic performance and production, jump cuts between and in songs, judicious use of sampling and production craziness, and an overall air of looming science fiction apocalypse and doom." It was described as post-punk by music writer Simon Reynolds. NME journalist Andy Gill wrote that the album departed from earlier Chrome albums by featuring excessive use of "disconcerting sound-collage washes and interjections", as well as frequent "vocal fragmentation", with "very few cases of the one track/one riff syndrome" to be found on the songs. Was cited as the "beginning of industrial rock".

Reception 

British magazine The Wire included Half Machine Lip Moves on its list of "100 (130) Records That Set the World on Fire (While No One Was Listening)".

Track listing

Personnel 
 Chrome

 Helios Creed – lead vocals, rhythm and lead guitar, bass guitar, bells, bowed guitar
 Damon Edge – lead vocals, keyboard guitar, organ, synthesizer, Moog synthesizer, percussion, drums, rhythm guitar ("Turned Around"), tape operation, production, engineering, art direction, sleeve photography

 Additional personnel

 Gary Spain – bass guitar ("T.V. as Eyes", "Mondo Anthem")

 Technical

 John L. Cyborg – electronics
 Bernie Grundman – mastering
 Amy James – sleeve photography, cover design

References

External links 
 

1979 albums
Chrome (band) albums
Beggars Banquet Records albums
Dossier Records albums
Touch and Go Records albums
Cleopatra Records albums
Sound collage albums